The Americas Zone was one of the three zones of the regional Davis Cup competition in 1998.

In the Americas Zone there were four different tiers, called groups, in which teams competed against each other to advance to the upper tier. The top two teams in Group IV advanced to the Americas Zone Group III in 1999. All other teams remained in Group IV.

Participating nations

Draw
 Venue: St. Lucia Racquet Club, Gros Islet, Saint Lucia
 Date: 23–29 March

  and  promoted to Group III in 1999.

Results

Netherlands Antilles vs. Eastern Caribbean

Barbados vs. Honduras

U.S. Virgin Islands vs. Trinidad and Tobago

Saint Lucia vs. Eastern Caribbean

Netherlands Antilles vs. U.S. Virgin Islands

Honduras vs. Trinidad and Tobago

Saint Lucia vs. U.S. Virgin Islands

Netherlands Antilles vs. Barbados

Eastern Caribbean vs. Trinidad and Tobago

Saint Lucia vs. Trinidad and Tobago

Barbados vs. Eastern Caribbean

Honduras vs. U.S. Virgin Islands

Saint Lucia vs. Honduras

Netherlands Antilles vs. Trinidad and Tobago

Barbados vs. U.S. Virgin Islands

Saint Lucia vs. Barbados

Netherlands Antilles vs. Honduras

Eastern Caribbean vs. U.S. Virgin Islands

Saint Lucia vs. Netherlands Antilles

Barbados vs. Trinidad and Tobago

Eastern Caribbean vs. Honduras

References

External links
Davis Cup official website

Davis Cup Americas Zone
Americas Zone Group IV